U.Be Love is the third studio album and second mini album by Japanese J-pop singer and songwriter Maki Ohguro. It was released on 10 November 1993 under B-Gram Records.

Album consist of two previously released singles, Wakaremashou Watashi kara Kiemashou Anata kara and Harlem Night. The coupling song Kimi wo Aisareru Sono tame ni from single Chotto was included in this album as well. Blue Christmas is the first Christmas thematic song written and composed by Maki herself.

The album reached No. 2 in its first week on the Oricon chart. The album sold 267,640 copies.

Track listing
All tracks arranged by Takeshi Hayama.

References

Being Inc. albums
Japanese-language EPs
1993 EPs
Maki Ohguro albums
Albums produced by Daiko Nagato